Camille Chen (born September 1, 1979) is a Taiwanese-born American actress.

Early life, education, and career 
Born in Taiwan but raised in the U.S., Chen attended the University of Texas at Austin and then began her career in show business, doing voiceover work for the English version of anime television series such as Lost Universe and the Devil. 

Chen's first feature film roles were uncredited appearances as Miss New Hampshire in the 2000 film, Miss Congeniality, and as a cheerleader in the 2002 film, The New Guy.

Later career 
From 2006 to 2007, Chen had a regular recurring role as Samantha Li on Studio 60 on the Sunset Strip. She guest-starred on the 2009 episode of Law & Order, "Just a Girl in the World" as Emma Kim, first thought to be the target of a serial killer, but later discovered to be the murderer herself. On stage, Chen portrayed "Christmas Eve" in a 2012 Los Angeles production of Avenue Q.

In 2016, Chen starred in Poor Todd, an independent pilot selected by the New York Television Festival for its Independent Pilot Competition. In 2017, she had a prominent guest-starring role in an episode of the TV series Teachers, playing Mrs. Chan, "a priggish mother of two and president of the parent group Two Million Moms".

In a 2017 interview by The Guardian, she addressed barriers facing Asian actors:

Chen's performance as a "tactless doctor" in a bit part in the 2018 film Game Night was reviewed in The Village Voice as "a deadpan gift", in a scene described by The Hollywood Reporter as "one of Game Night's funnier scenes", and by The New Yorker as making "memorable impressions". Also in 2018, she guest-starred in multiple episodes of Unsolved: The Murders of Tupac and the Notorious B.I.G. as robbery-homicide department secretary Grace Kim. She had a starring role in the independent pilot "I Was a Teenage Pillow Queen", premiered in September 2018 at the Tribeca TV Festival, and in November 2018, she guest-starred in two episodes of Single Parents. In January 2019, Chen guest-starred on an episode of God Friended Me.

She has also appeared in about two dozen advertising campaigns, including some prominent commercial roles.

In 2020, Chen appeared as a guest on the Studio 60 on the Sunset Strip marathon fundraiser episode of The George Lucas Talk Show. In 2021, she guest starred on the series finale of Rebel.

Work

Feature films

Short films

Television

Voice

Select television commercials

References

External links 
 
 

1979 births
Living people
American film actresses
American actresses of Chinese descent
American television actresses
American voice actresses
Taiwanese emigrants to the United States
21st-century American women